The Air Force Intelligence Directorate is an intelligence service of Syria, possibly the country's most powerful, owing its importance to Hafez al-Assad's role as the Air Force commander.
Despite its name, it is mainly involved with issues other than air force intelligence, and took an active part in the suppression of the Muslim Brotherhood rebellion in the 1980s. Agents of this service have frequently been stationed in Syrian embassies or branch offices of the national airline.

The service was headed for nearly thirty years by Maj. Gen. Muhammad al-Khuli, who was trusted by Hafez al-Assad and had an office adjacent to the president's in the presidential palace. 
In 1995, it was headed by Ibrahim Huwayji.

As of 2019, it is headed by Gen Ghassan Jaoudat Ismail. Hassan previously served as a security official in the eastern governorate of Deir ez-Zor. He is a part of Bashar al-Assad's inner circle, though he has criticized "the decision of the leadership" to not immediately crush the 2011 Syrian uprising in its very beginning, making him a hardliner in the Syrian leadership.

The service also took part in the efforts to put down the 2011 Syrian uprising against Bashar al-Assad's government. It is known to have been active in the town of Talkalakh near the Lebanese border.

Heads of Air Force Intelligence Directorate 
Muhammad al-Khuli (1963–1987)
Ibrahim Huwayji (1987–2002)
Iz a-Din Isma'il (2002 – )
Deputy director: Ali Mamlouk ( – June 2005)
Abdel-Fatah Qudsiyeh ( – 2009)
Jamil Hassan (2009–2019) was sanctioned by the European Union for being "involved in violence against the civilian population."
 Deputy director: Fu'ad Tawil (2012) was sanctioned by European Union for "the use of violence across Syria and intimidation and torture of protestors."
 Head of Investigative branch: Maj. Gen. Abdulsalam Fajer Mahmoud (2011), accused of ordering or committing crimes against humanity by Human Rights Watch.
 Head of Special Operations branch: Maj. Gen. Ghassan Ismail (2011).
 Head of Operations branch: Col. Suheil Hassan (2011).
 Ghassan Jaoudat Ismail (2019–present)

Regional Heads of Air Force Intelligence Directorate  

Damascus branch: Eyad Mandou (2012)
Homs branch: Brig. Gen. Jawdat al-Ahmed (2012) accused of "ordering or committing crimes against humanity".
Daraa branch: Col. Qusay Mihoub (2012) accused of "ordering or committing crimes against humanity".
Latakia branch: Col. Suhail Al-Abdullah (2012) accused of "ordering or committing crimes against humanity".

Paramilitary units 
 Guardians of the Dawn
 Lions of the Cherubim
 Earthquake of Jobar
 Ararat Group
 Lions of the Valley
 Intervention Regiment
 Lions of Dwel’a
 Khaybar Brigade
 Fawj Nusur Homs

Other Syrian intelligence agencies 
General Security Directorate
Political Security Directorate
Military Intelligence Directorate

References 

Syrian intelligence agencies
Syrian Air Force
Air intelligence